Nabi Dehga (also Romanized as Nabī Dehgā; also known as Nabī Dehkā and Navīd Dehkā) is a village in Kiashahr Rural District, Kiashahr District, Astaneh-ye Ashrafiyeh County, Gilan Province, Iran. At the 2006 census, its population was 330, in 88 families.

References 

Populated places in Astaneh-ye Ashrafiyeh County